Kley is a surname. Notable people with the surname include: 

Chaney Kley (1972–2007), American actor
Dale K. Van Kley (born 1941), American historian
Heinrich Kley (1863–1945), German illustrator
Ivan Kley (born 1958), Brazilian tennis player
Karl-Ludwig Kley (born 1951), German businessman